Shoddy the Tailor is a 1915 American silent comedy film featuring Oliver Hardy.

Plot

Cast
 Raymond McKee - Henry Buggs
 Harry Lorraine - Police Chief
 Mabel Paige - Myrtle, an Old Maid
 Frances Ne Moyer - Minnie
 Eva Bell - Clara
 Nellie Farron - Ruth
 Oliver Hardy - Policeman (as Babe Hardy)

See also
 List of American films of 1915
 Oliver Hardy filmography

External links

1915 films
American silent short films
American black-and-white films
1915 comedy films
1915 short films
Silent American comedy films
Lubin Manufacturing Company films
American comedy short films
1910s American films